The Convent of the Calced Augustinians (Spanish: Convento de las Agustinas Calzadas) is an Augustinian convent located in Toledo, Spain. The word "calzadas" translates to "calced" (or shod) in English, referring to the fact that the community wore shoes, rather than going barefoot as other (stricter) religious orders did.

Architecture 
The building is designated a Property of Cultural Interest.

The building contains a small central courtyard surrounded by living and working quarters. Architecturally, the convent has had a complicated history. It was begun in the 17th century and was adapted in the mid-18th century from existing structures; paid for by Luis II Fernandez de Cordoba, Count of Teba and Cardinal Archbishop of Toledo between 1755 and 1771.

Painting 
The chapel has an altar-piece by the baroque painter Francisco Rizi.

References

Note
This contains information taken from the homonymous article in the Spanish Wikipedia.

External links 

Agustinas Calzadas
Agustinas Calzadas
Toledo
Bien de Interés Cultural landmarks in the City of Toledo
18th-century Roman Catholic church buildings in Spain